Charnvit Kasetsiri (born May 6, 1941) is a Thai historian. He is a professor emeritus of the Thammasat University and was its rector in 1994–1995.

Life and academic career 
He studied diplomacy and history at the Thammasat University, Bangkok from 1960 to 1963 and graduated with Honours and the King Bhumibol Prize with a B.A. in diplomacy. He then pursued a master's degree at the Occidental College, Los Angeles, California, US. Kasetsiri obtained his Ph.D. in Southeast Asian history from Cornell University in 1972, under the supervision of O. W. Wolters and David K. Wyatt. He held a Rockefeller Scholarship in 1965–1970 during his studies in the United States.

He began his academic service with the university as a lecturer in the history department in 1973. He was appointed head of department in 1981–83. Subsequently, he was also appointed as the deputy director of Thai Khadi Institute, Thammasat University (1982–85) and the vice-president of Thammasat University (1983–88). He continued lecturing in the history department following his appointment as dean of the Faculty of Liberal Arts, Thammasat University. He was the rector of Thammasat University during the academic year 1994–95. He continues to teach at the history department after retirement in 2001.

From 2000 to 2003 he was appointed director of the 5 Area Study Project, sponsored by the Thailand Research Fund. Currently, he also holds the post of secretary of the Social Sciences and Humanity Textbook Foundation, Thailand. Among the overseas appointments he has held during his academic career were as visiting fellow, at the Center for Southeast Asian Studies, Kyoto University, Japan (1977–78); visiting lecturer (Southeast Asian History) at University of California, Berkeley and Santa Cruz, U.S.A. (1978–79); visiting lecturer (Thailand History), University of Hawaii, U.S. (1996); visiting fellow, Institute of Southeast Asian Studies, Singapore (1998); and visiting lecturer, Asian Studies, University of Hawaii in 2004.

Selected publications
Charnvit has published numerous articles on Thai history. Among his book publications (in English) are: 
 The Rise of Ayudhya: A History of Siam in the Fourteenth and Fifteenth Centuries. Kuala Lumpur: Oxford University Press, 1976
 International Workshop On Translation. Foundation for the Promotion of The Social Sciences and the Humanities Textbooks Project, Thailand, 1978 
 Bibliography: Southeast Asian Studies in Thailand. Compiled with T. Petchlertanan and S. Saiyawong, Thailand-Japan Core Universities Program, Kyoto University, The Center for Southeast Asian Studies and Thammasat University, 1991.
 Sangkhalok-Sukhothai-Ayutthaya and Asia. Bangkok: Toyota Thailand Foundation, 2002
 Discovering Ayutthaya. with Michael Wright. Bangkok: Toyota Thailand Foundation, 2007
 Annotated bibliography on the Mekong. Compiled with Chris Baker. Mekong Press, 2008.
 Thai historiography. In: Pavin Chachavalpongpun, Routledge Handbook of Contemporary Thailand. Routledge, 2019.

References
 allbookstores - Book list
 Journal entry by M. Ahn

External links
 Charnvit Web Site
 Seeds of Misunderstanding
 FIGHT FOR DEMOCRACY: First stirrings of a passive population
 Historian campaigns to rename Thailand Siam

Historians of Southeast Asia
Charnvit Kasetsiri
1941 births
Living people
Charnvit Kasetsiri
Occidental College alumni
Cornell University alumni
Charnvit Kasetsiri
Charnvit Kasetsiri
Charnvit Kasetsiri
Charnvit Kasetsiri